Wilson Central High School is part of the Wilson County School System, and is located in Lebanon, Tennessee.

It serves: portions of Lebanon, all of Rural Hill, all of Gladeville, and portions of Mount Juliet south of Interstate 40.

Demographics
The demographic breakdown of the 17,879 students enrolled in 2016–2017 was:
Male - 52.2%
Female - 47.8%
Asian - 2.3%
Black - 8.4%
Hispanic - 5.6%
White - 82.0%
Multiracial - 1.5%

Athletics
Wilson Central won 2006 and 2008 3A state girls basketball championship.
Wilson Central is also home of the 2015 TSSAA softball state champions.

Wilson Central Wrestling is the pre-eminent wrestling program in the Midstate. Wilson Central is coached by John Kramer. 
2019–20 season: 28–1, district, region dual and individual region champions
State runner up at State Duals
State runner up at individual State
8 Individual State Medalists: 1 state champ (Hunter Borders), 2 runner ups 2 fourths, a 5th and 2 6th-place finishes at individual state

References

External links
 

Public high schools in Tennessee
Schools in Wilson County, Tennessee
Lebanon, Tennessee